Al-Waqf may refer to:

 Al Waqf, Egypt, city
 Al-Waqf, Syria, village
 Al-Waqf, Yemen, village